The Senegal Music Awards (SENMA) is an annual celebration of the best of the music industry in Senegal.  The event was instituted in 2008.  Awards based on performances made in the previous year in 56 categories.  The ceremonies include performances by some of the nominees. Is equivalent of South African Music Awards and Grammy awards.

First Senegal Music Awards
The award ceremony took place on 6 March 2009 at Mbour (Saly).

General
 Best Female Artist-Titi 
 Best Male Artist- Pape Diouf
 Best Group- Alif
 Best Song- Tayoumako (Titi)
 Best Album- Music (Titi)
 Best Single- biss bi(Abdou guitté Seck)
 Best New Female Artist- Adiouza
 Best New Male Artist- Waly Seck

Orchestral / religious
 Best Orchestral Performance- Ali Jabert
 Best Choral Performance- Semegna Les martyrs de l'ouganda
 Best Islamic Performance-Baye (Aida Baye)

Comedy
 Best Comedy Artist- Sanekh
 Best Comedy Cd- Bébé Diarra- Jankheen

Composing / arranging
 Best Arrangement-je t'aime- Myrma

Mbalax
 Best Female mbalax Vocal Performance-Tayoumako(Titi)
 Best Male mbalax Vocal Performance- Yaye (Pape Diouf)
 Best mbalax Performance, Duo or Group- Bercy (Youssou Ndour et Thione Seck)
 Best mbalax Instrumental Performance- Rokki mi rokka (Youssou Ndour)
 Best mbalax Song- Music(Titi)
 Best mbalax Album- Music(Titi)
 Best mbalax Single- Bess bi(Abdou guitté Seck))
 Best New Female mbalax Artist - Adiouza
 Best New Male mbalax Artist - Waly Seck

Dance
 Best Dancer Female- Ndeye Gueye
 Best Dancer male- Pape Moussa

Folk
 Best Folk Album- Yodel Baaba Maal
 Best Folk Vocal Performance, Female- Fanta Fatou Kouyaté
 Best Folk Vocal Performance, Male- Yodel Baba Maal

Legend
 Best Female legend Artist- Khar Mbaye
 Best male legend Artist- Youssou N'Dour

Jazz
 Best Jazz Artist- Souleymane Faye
 Best Jazz Instrumental Album, Individual or Group- Joe Gueye

Tropical / salsa music 
 Best Tropical/salsa  Album - mi amor Phillip Monteiro
 Best  Tropical/salsa music  Vocal Performance, Female- Amor (Zeynab)
 Best  Tropical/salsa music  Vocal Performance, Male- mi Amor (Phillip Monteiro)

Music Video
 Best Video clip of the Year -Blow (Nix)

Production / engineering
 Best Engineer- Gelongal
 Producer of the Year- Jololi

Hip-hop
 Best Female Hip hop Vocal Performance- Listen me Felia
 Best Male Hip-hop Vocal Performance- Senregal (Carlou d)
 Best Hip-hop Performance by a Duo or Group- Rarety (Alif)
 Best Hip-hop Instrumental Performance- Blow (Nix)
 Best Hip-hop Song- Bal bi (Xuman)
 Best Hip-hop Album- enregal (Carlou d)

Reggae
 Best Reggae song- A wonderful girl (Fafadi)
 Best Female Reggae Vocal Performance- Aduna Ndiayaa
 Best Male Reggae Vocal Performance-A wonderful girl (Fafadi)

Traditional
 Best Traditional Album- Alal (Ndeye marie ndiaye Gawlo)

Diaspora
 Best World Album- Na na na(Akon)
 Best World Artist Female-  Listen me (Felia)
 Best World Artist Male-Nanana (Akon)

Share
 Best share of the year- Rokki mi rokka Yousssou Ndour

 Senegalese music
 African music awards